Glyndŵr's Way is a long-distance footpath in mid Wales.

History 

Its name derives from the early 15th century Welsh prince and folk hero Owain Glyndŵr, whose parliament sat in Machynlleth in 1404. Glyndŵr's Way was granted National Trail status in 2000 to mark the beginning of the third millennium and the 600th anniversary of an ill-fated but long-running and culturally significant rebellion in 1400.

Route 
The footpath officially begins in Knighton, on the English border, where it links with Offa's Dyke Path. Running in roughly a horseshoe shape, it passes small market towns such as Llanidloes and quiet villages including Abbeycwmhir and Llanbadarn Fynydd, traversing central Mid Wales to Machynlleth near the Dyfi estuary and returning across Wales via Llanbrynmair, Llangadfan and Lake Vyrnwy and the valley of the River Vyrnwy to Welshpool  from the Wales–England border.

Some walkers complete it start to finish in about 10 days, some complete it in sections over various weekends, and some just walk the section that appeals to them. The route is varied, is often challenging, and should not be attempted without preparation. Accommodation can be booked all along the route at hotels, guest houses or campsites.

The route passes nationally important Welsh natural habitats such as sessile oak woodlands, upland mire and heath, and ancient hedgerows. The area from Staylittle to Aberhosan is noted for its heather moorlands.

See also
 Long-distance footpaths in the United Kingdom
 National Trails
 Wales Coast Path

References

External links 

 
 The Long Distance Walkers Association
 The Ramblers
 BBC Radio 4 Iconic Walk

Footpaths in Powys
Recreational walks in Wales
Long-distance footpaths in Wales